The 2020 Judo Grand Prix Tel Aviv was held in Tel Aviv, Israel, from 23 to 25 January 2020.

Medal summary

Men's events

Women's events

Source Results

Medal table

References

External links
 

2020 IJF World Tour
2020 Judo Grand Prix
IJF World Tour Tel Aviv
Grand Prix 2020
Judo
Judo
Judo
Judo